Zhang Yongjie (born 11 April 1968) is a Chinese sport shooter who competed in the 1992 Summer Olympics, in the 1996 Summer Olympics, and in the 2000 Summer Olympics.

He is from Qingdao.

References

1968 births
Living people
Chinese male sport shooters
Trap and double trap shooters
Olympic shooters of China
Shooters at the 1992 Summer Olympics
Shooters at the 1996 Summer Olympics
Shooters at the 2000 Summer Olympics
Shooters at the 1990 Asian Games
Shooters at the 1994 Asian Games
Shooters at the 2002 Asian Games
Shooters at the 2010 Asian Games
Asian Games medalists in shooting
Asian Games gold medalists for China
Asian Games silver medalists for China
Asian Games bronze medalists for China
Medalists at the 1990 Asian Games
Medalists at the 1994 Asian Games
Medalists at the 2002 Asian Games
Sport shooters from Shandong
21st-century Chinese people